Sa'adi Simawe (1946 – February 19, 2017) was an Iraqi American author, teacher and translator, who  has published many articles in English and Arabic, both original and in translation, and a novel (in Arabic) Al-Khuruj min al-Qumqum, London 1999.  He is the editor of an anthology of 40 writers, "Iraqi Poetry Today", published by Zephyr Press in 2003 and author of the work of cultural criticism, "Black Orpheus: Music in African American Fiction from the Harlem Renaissance to Toni Morrison", Garland 2000.

Background
Simawe was born into a middle-class family in Diwaniyah, Iraq, in 1946. While a teenager, he was arrested, imprisoned, and beaten severely for publishing leaflets against the Ba'ath Party. After six years in prison, he was freed in a political amnesty and was allowed to return to school; he completed a BA degree in English at Al-Mustansiriya University in Baghdad. He graduated in June 1976 and left Iraq on a tourist visa; his mother paid a substantial fine, equivalent to approximately a year's income, when he did not return.

Simawe made his way via Paris to North Africa, where he taught Arabic and English in high schools in Libya until 1980. He has made several return trips to North Africa to teach, write and do research.

Simawe obtained a student visa to the USA in 1980 and traveled from Tripoli, Libya to Lincoln, Nebraska, where he enrolled as a graduate student at the University of Nebraska. He received an MA in English from the University of Nebraska in 1983. The following fall he enrolled at the University of Iowa in Iowa City. Simawe first completed an MA in African-American Literature, before going on to a PhD in English, which he completed in 1994. Darwin Turner (1932–1991), the well-respected scholar of African American Studies, was Simawe's thesis advisor.

He joined the faculty of Grinnell College in 1992, where  he was an associate professor of English, teaching courses in African-American and Arabic literature.  Simawe took a leave from teaching effective fall 2007 due to illness, though he continued his writing and translation work.

As is frequently the case with Iraqi intellectuals of the most recent generation, he was unable to return to Iraq after he left in 1976, except for a brief two-week trip into the northern Kurdish zone after the fall of Saddam Hussein.  The travelers, sponsored by the Writers Union of Iraq, represented all of the ethnic entities of Iraq.

Simawe died on February 19, 2017, in Coralville, Iowa, from complications with Parkinson's disease.

Notes

1946 births
2017 deaths
Arabic–English translators
Iraqi emigrants to the United States
University of Nebraska alumni
University of Iowa alumni
Grinnell College faculty
American Shia Muslims
Iraqi Shia Muslims
Iraqi translators
Iraqi writers
Neurological disease deaths in Iowa
Deaths from Parkinson's disease
Al-Mustansiriya University alumni
International Writing Program alumni
20th-century translators